The 1943 Cotton Bowl Classic was a college football bowl game played on  January 1, 1943 at the Cotton Bowl in Dallas, TX

Background
This was Texas's first bowl game. They were led by Dana X. Bible. This was Georgia Tech's second bowl game of what would be six in the 1940s.

Game summary
Max Minor caught a touchdown pass from Roy McKay and Jackie Field returned a punt 60 yards for a touchdown to give Texas a 14-0 lead into the fourth quarter as Bible replaced his starters.

But Georgia Tech drove 56 yards capped by a David Eldredge touchdown run to narrow the lead. Georgia Tech forced Texas to punt as Tech went on the offensive. They drove all the way to the Texas 5 yard-line, but Texas' defensive line stopped them short as Texas took over at the four. They ran out the clock as Texas won their first bowl game.

Aftermath
Since this game, Texas has been to 22 more Cotton Bowl Classics and have won 11 more times, the most Cotton Bowl victories of any team. Georgia Tech did not return to the Cotton Bowl Classic until 1955.

Statistics

References

Cotton Bowl Classic
Cotton Bowl Classic
Georgia Tech Yellow Jackets football bowl games
Texas Longhorns football bowl games
January 1943 sports events
Cotton Bowl